Orgyia detrita, the fir tussock moth or live oak tussock moth, is a tussock moth in the family Erebidae. The species was first described by Félix Édouard Guérin-Méneville in 1831. It is found in North America.

The MONA or Hodges number for Orgyia detrita is 8313.

References

Further reading

External links
 

Lymantriinae
Articles created by Qbugbot
Moths described in 1831